Megan Curran Rosenbloom (born 1981) is an American medical librarian and expert on anthropodermic bibliopegy, the practice of binding books in human skin. She is a team member of the Anthropodermic Book Project, a group which scientifically tests skin-bound books to determine if their origins are human.

Education
In 2004, Rosenbloom earned a bachelor of arts degree in journalism from Drexel University. Rosenbloom received her Master of Library and Information Science from the University of Pittsburgh in 2008.

Career
Rosenbloom works as a medical librarian at University of Southern California Norris Medical Library, and as an obituary editor for the Journal of the Medical Library Association.

Through her library work, Rosenbloom had access to a large number of old and rare medical books that were also about death. She began doing public lectures on the way the history of medical advancements is intertwined with the use of nameless corpses and met Caitlin Doughty; together they curate Death Salon events. Rosenbloom believes the more people deny the inevitability of death, "the more people are psychically destroyed when it happens in their lives." She co-founded and directs Death Salon, the events arm of The Order of the Good Death where people can have conversations and discussions with others about death. Death Salons are a mix of private Order of the Good Death business and public events, happening nearly annually since 2013.

As a member of the Anthropodermic Book Project, Rosenbloom and her colleagues Daniel Kirby, Richard Hark and Anna Dhody use peptide mass fingerprinting to determine if the binding on books is of human origin. Rosenbloom is part of the outreach team, trying to convince rare book libraries to have their books tested.

Writing

See also 
Death Cafe

References

External links
 Official website
 

American librarians
Persons involved with death and dying
Living people
Women and death
Drexel University alumni
University of Pittsburgh alumni
American women librarians
University of Southern California people
1981 births